Sherlock is a 1984 text adventure developed under the lead of Philip Mitchell by Beam Software. It was published by Melbourne House. Five programmers worked for 18 months on the title and a Sherlock Holmes expert was employed full-time for a year to advise the team on accuracy.

Technically, the adventure builds upon the 1982 title The Hobbit. Autonomous NPCs and realtime gameplay, two sophisticated features of The Hobbit, are present in Sherlock - as is Inglish, the parser responsible for analyzing the player's commands. The game simulated 'real time'; trains ran to a time table and key plot events began at exactly specified moments. There was also an attempt to move beyond 'instructional' communication with characters (in which non-player characters are told or asked to complete actions the player does not wish to or is unable to complete) to 'dialogic' communication in which characters could be questioned, challenged and persuaded with evidence. The latter was an early attempt to simulate changing states of consciousness within an interactive narrative.

Plot
A double murder has been committed in the town of Leatherhead and Dr. Watson has encouraged the player, who plays Holmes, to investigate. Inspector Lestrade is also investigating.

Bugs
The game is notorious for a large number of surreal and amusing bugs due to the complex potential interactions between characters. For example:
 Policemen can still talk, and obstruct Holmes, while unconscious.
 Hansom cab drivers can blame Holmes for anyone who fails to pay their fare anywhere on the map, can be used to force improper objects (such as trains) to appear inside cabs, and can be confused into driving the player into a null location which is used as the store for nouns, allowing Holmes to pick up items such as "innocent", "your alibi" and "an opium den".
 Inspector Lestrade normally arrests the wrong man early in the game, causing a Game Over unless Holmes has shown the man's innocence; however, Holmes can also wait for Lestrade to get in a cab, then tell his cabbie from outside to drive to a random location, causing Lestrade to freeze because he doesn't know what to do there.
 Watson is described as "the only character with a memory", but if the player allows Watson to see too many events happening, his memory overflows the available RAM of the system and the game crashes.

References

External links 
 
 Images of Sherlock package, manual and screen shots
 Emulator which shows what's going on 'behind the scene' in the ZX Spectrum version
 

1980s interactive fiction
1984 video games
Commodore 64 games
Detective video games
Interactive fiction based on works
Video games based on Sherlock Holmes
Video games developed in Australia
Video games set in Surrey
ZX Spectrum games